Maharaja Sir Rajagopala Krishna Yachendra  (1857–1916) was an Indian nobleman and politician. He was the Maharaja  of Venkatagiri in Nellore district from 1878 to 1916.He was the 28th Maharaja of Venkatagiri.M.L.C. (Madras) 1888 .
He belonged to the royal Velugoti Dynasty of the Padmanayaka Velamas. He is known to have reformed and encouraged education during his tenure as M.L.C and even as the Maharajah of Venkatagiri .

Rajagopala was a non-official member of Madras Legislative Council. He served in the Council starting from 1887. His brother's grandson is Ramakrishna Ranga Rao became the Chief Minister of Madras Presidency after dyarchy was established.
One of his grandson who was adopted by the Maharani of Kolanka, later became Maharaja of Kolanka and got the Kolanka Cup made.

Honours 
Rajagopala Yachendra was made a Knight Commander of the Order of the Indian Empire (KCIE) in May 1888 and subsequently promoted to a Knight Grand Commander (GCIE) in the 1915 New Year Honours List. He was awarded the Kaiser-i-Hind Medal in 1900. He also received the Delhi Durbar Medal .

Notes

References 
 Venkatagiri zamindari

Andhra Pradesh local politicians
1857 births
1916 deaths
Knights Grand Commander of the Order of the Indian Empire
Companions of the Order of the Star of India
Recipients of the Kaisar-i-Hind Medal
Members of the Madras Legislative Council
Indian knights
People from Nellore district
Indian royalty